Mike Nguyen is a Vietnamese-American artist who worked as a Supervising Animator on Warner Bros.' Quest for Camelot, The Iron Giant, and Osmosis Jones but is best known for creating his own animated feature My Little World.

Biography 
Mike Nguyen received his BFA in character animation at the California Institute of the Arts in 1988. Since then, he has worked in the feature animation film industry for over 10 years as an animator, for major studios such as Disney, DreamWorks, and Warner Bros.

External links 
RainPlace-official site
 Speaker Bio on VPS Conference 2004

American film directors of Taiwanese descent
American artists of Vietnamese descent
American people of Vietnamese descent
American animators
California Institute of the Arts alumni
Vietnamese film directors
Year of birth missing (living people)
Living people